La Esmeralda may refer to:

 La Esmeralda, Chihuahua, rural community in Ojinaga Municipality, Chihuahua, Mexico
 La Esmeralda, Panama
 La Esmeralda, Uruguay, seaside resort in Rocha Department
 La Esmeralda, Venezuela, town in Amazonas, Venezuela
 La Esmeralda (ballet) by Cesare Pugni
 La Esmeralda (opera) by Louise Bertin
 Escuela Nacional de Pintura, Escultura y Grabado "La Esmeralda", a Mexican art school

See also
Esmeralda (disambiguation)